Spodnje Stranice is a settlement in the Municipality of Zreče in northeastern Slovenia. It lies on the main road to Vojnik, southwest of the town of Zreče. The area is part of the traditional region of Styria. It is now included with the rest of the municipality in the Savinja Statistical Region.

History
In 1998, the hamlet of Graben was administratively separated from Stranice and made a settlement in its own right. In 1999, Graben was renamed Spodnje Stranice (literally, 'lower Stranice').

References

External links
Spodnje Stranice at Geopedia

Populated places in the Municipality of Zreče